Khak-e Sefid-e Bala (also Romanized as Khāk-e Sefīd-e Bālā; also known as Khāk-e Sefīd and Khāk Sefīd) is a village in Sarduiyeh Rural District, Sarduiyeh District, Jiroft County, Kerman Province, Iran. At the 2006 census, its population was 192, in 41 families.

References 

Populated places in Jiroft County